The Royal Lao Army (– ARL), also designated by its anglicized title RLA, was the Land Component of the Royal Lao Armed Forces (FAR), the official military of the Kingdom of Laos during the North Vietnamese invasion of Laos and the Laotian Civil War between 1960 and 1975.

History

The ARL traced back its origins to World War II, when the first entirely Laotian military unit, the 1st Laotian Rifle Battalion ( – BCL), was raised early in 1941 by the Vichy French colonial authorities.  Intended to be used on internal security operations to bolster the local colonial constabulary force, the "Indigenous Guard", the 1er BCL did not see much action until after March 9, 1945, when the Japanese Imperial Army forcibly seized control of French Indochina from France, including Laos.  The battalion then retreated into the mountains, where they linked with the Laotian irregular guerrilla fighters operating there.  These guerrillas were supplied, trained, and led by teams of Free French agents who had been trained in special jungle warfare by the British Special Operations Executive (SOE) in India and were subsequently parachuted into Indochina in December 1944 with the aim of creating a local anti-Japanese resistance network. 
Under the command of their Free French cadres, the battalion's Laotian soldiers engaged in guerrilla actions alongside the irregular "Maquisards" against the Japanese occupation forces in Laos until Japan's surrender on August 15, 1945.  In November of that same year, the various Laotian guerrilla groups were consolidated into four regular light infantry battalions and, together with the 1er BCL, integrated into the newly founded French Union Army.

Meanwhile, confronted in early May 1945 with the Allied Powers' victory over Nazi Germany and sensing their own imminent defeat, the Japanese military authorities in Laos began stirring up local anti-French nationalistic sentiments.  In October of that year, a group of supporters of Laotian independence led by Prince Phetsarath Ratanavongsa deposed King Sisavang Vong and announced the formation of a new government body, the Committee for Independent Laos or Khana Lao Issara and Lao Issara for short.
Taking advantage of the temporary absence of French authority in the country's main cities, the Lao Issara promptly established an armed defense force to exercise its authority with the support of Ho Chi Minh's Viet Minh Hanoi-based government in the Tonkin and the Nationalist Chinese.  The Lao Issara "Army" was essentially a lightly-armed militia force, provided with a mixed assortment of small-arms captured from the Japanese, looted from French colonial depots, or sold by the Chinese Nationalist Army troops who occupied northern Laos under the terms of the 1945 Potsdam Conference.

The National Laotian Army 1946–1955
In early March 1946, the French Union Army aligned some 4,000 Laotian troops organized into five light infantry battalions – the 1er, 2e, 3e, 4e, 5e, and 6e BCLs – led by a cadre of French officers and senior NCOs, which participated actively in the French reoccupation of Laos.  That month, the Laotian battalions provided infantry support to French Far East Expeditionary Corps (CEFEO) armoured units fighting Lao Issara troops at the Battle of Thakhek in Khammouane Province.  By the end of April, they had assisted the French in the recapture of Vientiane, followed in May by Luang Prabang which forced the Lao Issara leadership to flee to exile in Thailand.  Upon the successful conclusion of the campaign, the Laotian battalions continued with small counter-insurgency operations against remnant bands of Lao Issara insurgents over the next three years, assuming responsibility for internal security duties in the areas located along the Thai border.

However, faced with the potential threat posed by the growing Viet Minh insurgency in neighbouring Vietnam, the French instituted on July 1, 1949 a separated National Laotian Army ( – ANL) of the French Union to defend Laos.  Its formation actually began earlier in 1947 as an informal gathering of several indigenous irregular auxiliary units made of ex-Lao Issara guerrillas raised early by the French to reinforce their regular CEFEO units.

In July 1959, the ANL, the Laotian Navy, and the Laotian Aviation were gathered into the newly created Laotian Armed Forces ( – FAL), renamed Royal Lao Armed Forces ( – FAR) in September 1961.

Structure
The chain of command of the Royal Lao Army was placed under the Ministry of Defense in Vientiane.  The country was divided into five military regions, roughly corresponding to the areas of the country's 13 provinces.

To meet the threat represented by the Pathet Lao insurgency, the Royal Lao Army depended on a small French military training mission ( – MMFI-GRL), headed by a general officer, an exceptional arrangement permitted under the 1955 Geneva Accords, as well as covert assistance from the United States in the form of the Programs Evaluation Office (PEO). Military organization and tactical training reflected French traditions. Most of the equipment was of U.S. origin, however, because early in the First Indochina War, the Americans had been supplying the French with matériel ranging from guns to aircraft. Between 1962 and 1971, the U.S. provided Laos with direct military assistance, but not including the cost of equipping and training irregular and paramilitary forces by the Central Intelligence Agency (CIA). By the time the PEO changed into the Requirements Office in September 1962, the PEO believed "...the Laotian army continued to distinguish itself primarily by its lassitude and incompetence." PEO also noted that CIA-trained Hmong guerrillas were the only troops fighting to preserve northeastern Laos. When the PEO brought in Operation White Star trainers, the instructors found that 19 out of 20 Laotian soldiers had fewer than three years of education.

Organization 1959–1970

Laotian National Army strength in May 1959 peaked at 29,000 officers and enlisted men organized into twelve independent battalions – ten infantry and two airborne ( – BP) – plus one armored regiment and an artillery group. A Laotian regular infantry battalion was organized according to the French Army model into a battalion headquarters (HQ), three company HQs and three rifle companies.
Long-standing major formations above battalion level, such as Regiments, Half-brigades, Brigades or even Divisions, were virtually nonexistent at the time. Instead, from November 1960 infantry and Paratrooper battalions began to be brought together to form loosely organized "mobile groups" ( – GMs) or "Mobiles" for short, a tactical expedient inherited from the French who had employed it previously during the First Indochina War.  Being essentially a regimental-sized combat task-force, a typical Laotian GM consisted of two or three battalions' assembled for specific operations.  Originally raised on a temporary basis, the Mobile Groups were re-structured in April 1961 as permanent units, and by July 1962 the Laotian Army fielded nine such Groups, eight composed of regular units – GMs 12, 13, 14, 15 (Airborne), 16, 17, and 18 – and one of irregular guerrilla forces – GM B –, with two or more being allocated per each Military Region. By late 1966 the number of mobile groups had increased to twelve, with the addition of the airborne GMs 21 and 802, and the mixed GM 801. In practice, the Military Region's commanders used the GMs as their private armies to further their own interests, rarely dispatching them outside the Mekong River valley. The Mobile Groups' structure was retained until August 1968, when all GMs in the Laotian ground forces were abolished – the GMs 801 and 802 were not disbanded until the following year – and replaced by independent battalions.

The regular units were supplemented by eighteen Regional Battalions, eighteen Volunteer Battalions, and 247 irregular Commando Self-Defense village militia companies ( – ADC).  However, in November 1965 the Volunteer Battalions were disbanded and merged with the Regional Battalions, whilst the rural ADC militia companies were grouped with the irregular GM B to form the CIA-sponsored Special Guerrilla Units (SGUs).
Renamed the Royal Lao Army in September 1961, the new RLA remained essentially a light infantry force devoted primarily to static defense and internal security rather than national defense; most units were kept stationed near the main population centers (including Vientiane and the provincial capitals) guarding vital facilities such as depots, airfields, and lines of communication. As with its ANL predecessor, the RLA was capable only of limited offensive and counter-insurgency operations, and consequently its conventional military value was very low.

The earlier ANL support units, such as the Military police ( or  – PM), Medical, Quartermaster, Engineer, Geographic services, Signals, Transport, and Maintenance ( – RM) were also organized into independent battalions or companies. Later in the 1960s, the RLA technical branch services were re-organized and expanded to corps' strength, in order to include Finance, Military logistics, Ordnance, Military Fuel/Petrol, Oil and Lubricants – POL, Military justice, Psychological warfare and Military intelligence, all placed under the responsibility of the Service Directorates subordinated to the Ministry of National Defense. 
A uniformed female auxiliary service, the Royal Laotian Women's Army Corps – RLWAC ( – CFARL), was established in the early 1960s, whose members served in the RLA on administrative, staff, communications, political warfare, medical and other non-combatant duties.

Re-organization 1971-73

Following the Nam Bac débâcle, the demoralized Royal Lao Army reverted to its earlier static defense role of the main population centres along the Mekong River, relinquishing all offensive operations to the Paratrooper battalions, Commando units, the irregular ethnic SGUs, the Project "Unity" Thai volunteer battalions and the Royal Lao Air Force (RLAF). This move however, placed an additional heavy burden on these already overstretched elite formations that actually did most of the fighting. By December 1968, total Royal Lao Army strength stood at 45,000 troops on paper, but is estimated that the actual number was no less than 30,000-35,000, with its combat elements organized solely into fifty-eight independent light infantry battalions, one armoured regiment comprising three recce squadrons and one tank squadron, and a single artillery regiment consisting of four artillery battalions.

In 1971, with the Vietnamisation process in full swing in South Vietnam, a similar effort was attempted towards making the RLA a more effective, self-sufficient force. Following a US Army system of organization, the regular infantry battalions were consolidated into two light divisions, formally created on March 23, 1972 and locally designated as "Strike Divisions". Based at Luang Prabang, the 1st Strike Division commanded by Brigadier-General Bounchanh Savathphayphane, was tasked with operations in northern Laos whilst the 2nd Strike Division, commanded by Brig. Gen. Thao Ty and based at Seno near Savannakhet, was oriented towards the south.

As stipulated by the January 1973 Paris Peace Accords, the old ethnic SGU guerrilla forces were scheduled for integration into the RLA. However, most guerrillas – in particular those from the Hmong hill tribes – felt unwelcome in the regular army, still dominated as it was by the Lowland Lao, who were highly prejudiced towards the country's ethnic minorities.  In addition, the decreasing in pay and other privileges sharply dulled the cutting edge of what had been an effective fighting force, and left them incapable of halting the takeover of the country by the Pathet Lao.

Final operations 1974-75

By late 1974 a thinning of RLA ranks forced the FAR High Command to replace the two ineffective strike divisions by a series of smaller, understrength brigades. These were maintained until May 1975, when the Pathet Lao entered Vientiane and dissolved the FAR.

List of ANL and Royal Lao Army commanders

Colonel (later, General) Sounthone Pathammavong (1954–1958)
Major General Phoumi Nosavan (1958–1965)
Major General Ouane Rattikone
Major General Kouprasith Abhay (Deputy Commander-in-Chief of the Royal Lao Army, 1973–1975)

Notable field commanders
Major general Phasouk Somly Rasaphak
Brigadier general Soutchay Vongsavanh
Brigadier general Thao Ty
Major general Vang Pao
Major general Khamta Simmanotham
General Sengsouvanh Souvannarath
General Amkha Soukhavong
General Sing Rattanasamai
Colonel Bounleuth Saycocie
Colonel Saveng Vongsavath
Captain (later, Major General) Kong Le

Elite Forces
Royal Lao Army Airborne
Military Region 5 Commandos (MR 5 Cdos)
SPECOM

Weapons and equipment
Throughout its existence, the Royal Laotian Army received military assistance mainly from France and the United States, who provided since the late 1940s and mid-1950s respectively everything that the RLA used, from uniforms and boots to rifles, artillery and vehicles.

Small-arms
During the First Indochina War the Laotian National Army (ANL) weaponry was a hodgepodge, with most of its poorly trained units equipped in a haphazard way with an array of French, American, Australian, British, and German weapon systems, mostly of WWII-vintage. ANL Infantry battalions were issued with MAS-36, M1903 Springfield, and Lee–Enfield bolt-action rifles (airborne units received in addition the semi-automatic M1A1 paratrooper carbine), along with Sten, Owen, M1A1 Thompson, MAS-38 and MAT-49 submachine guns; FM 24/29, Bren, M1918A2 BAR and Browning M1919A6 .30 Cal light machine guns were used as squad weapons. Officers and NCOs received MAS-35-S, Luger P08, Walther P38, or Colt.45 M1911A1 pistols.

After 1955, the ANL began the process of standardisation on U.S. equipment. Airborne units took delivery of the M1 Garand semi-automatic rifle in late 1959, followed by the M2 Carbine the following year. The M3A1 Grease Gun was also received, along with Smith & Wesson Model 39 pistols, and M1917 and Smith & Wesson Model 10 revolvers. The ANL (renamed RLA in 1961) was equally provided with Browning M1919A4 .30 Cal Medium machine guns and Browning M2HB .50 Cal Heavy machine guns. Limited quantities of the Sterling submachine gun and L1A1 SLR Assault rifle were acquired from the British for evaluation, but they were never adopted as standard weapons by the RLA. The Carl Gustaf m/45 submachine gun was provided in small numbers by the Americans, eventually finding its way into the irregular SGU units. 
In 1969 secret deliveries of the CAR-15 carbine, the M16A1 assault rifle and M60 machine gun arrived in Laos, and were initially only given to the Laotian Royal Guard and airborne units; standardisation to the CAR-15, the M16 and M60 in the RLA and the irregular SGUs was completed by 1971.

ANL and RLA infantry, airborne, and commando formations were equipped with a variety of crew-served weapons. Mortars ranged from the Brandt mle 27/31 81mm to the M19 60mm, M29 81mm, M2 4.2 inch (107mm), M30 4.2 inch (106.7mm) models. They also received M18A1 57mm, M20 75mm, M67 90mm and M40A1 106mm recoilless rifles. In addition, individual portable rocket weapons were issued, in the form of the shoulder-fired M20A1 3.5 inch Super Bazooka, M79 "Blooper", XM-148 and M203 single-shot grenade launchers, and the expendable anti-tank, one-shot M72 LAW 66mm.

Captured infantry weapons of Soviet and Chinese origin, such as PPSh-41 submachine guns, SKS semi-automatic rifles, AK-47 assault rifles, RPD light machine guns, SG-43/SGM Goryunov medium machine guns, DShKM heavy machine guns and RPG-2 and RPG-7 anti-tank rocket launchers were also employed by elite commando units and the irregular SGUs while on special operations in the enemy-held areas of north-eastern and south-eastern Laos.

Armoured vehicles
By the mid-1950s, the ANL armoured corps inventory consisted of fifteen M24 Chaffee light tanks whilst the reconnaissance armoured squadron was provided with twenty M8 Greyhound and M20 Armoured Utility Cars.  Mechanized infantry battalions were issued with M3 half-tracks and fifteen M3A1 Scout Cars. These obsolete armored vehicles were used mainly for convoy escort duty and static defense of local provincial capitals, being rarely engaged in more offensive operations against the Pathet Lao or the NVA.

The Neutralists received in December 1961 forty-five PT-76 Model 1951 amphibious light tanks from the Soviet Union, with the vehicles being subsequently taken into RLA service in 1963 and employed on offensive operations, only to be withdrawn from frontline service in November of the following year due to shortages of spare parts and ammunition. In August 1969, during the Operation About Face to recapture the Plain of Jars, the irregular Hmong SGU guerrilla forces managed to capture from the NVA some twenty-five PT-76B tanks and immediately pressed them into service, being subsequently engaged in the 1970 wet season offensive in the Plain of Jars, but once again maintenance problems soon rendered the vehicles inoperable.

The FAR General Staff then requested the delivery of modern M41 Walker Bulldog light tanks to the RLA armoured corps in order to provide better armor support to the Hmong SGU guerrillas, but the request was declined by Washington, who provided instead in 1970-71 some second-hand fifteen M-706 armoured cars and twenty tracked M113 armored personnel carriers.

Artillery
Initially equipped with ten ex-French US M116 75mm pack howitzers and some M8 HMC 75mm self-propelled howitzers, the artillery corps fielded since 1963 twenty-five US-supplied M101A1 105mm towed field howitzers and ten M114A1 155mm towed field howitzers received in 1969. The RLA suffered from a serious fire-support shortfall throughout the War, since its small artillery corps was incapable to counter effectively the threat posed by the Soviet 122mm and 130mm long-range towed howitzers employed from 1970 onwards by the NVA and the Pathet Lao, as they outranged the US-made pieces.

Transport and liaison vehicles

Logistics were the responsibility of the transport corps, equipped with a variety of liaison and transportation vehicles handed down by the French or supplied by the Americans. The early ANL motor pool in the mid-1950s consisted in a mixed inventory of WWII-vintage U.S.
Willys MB ¼-ton (4x4) jeeps, Dodge WC-51/52 ¾-ton (4x4) utility trucks, Chevrolet G506 1½-ton (4x4) cargo trucks, and GMC CCKW 2½-ton (6x6) cargo trucks. These obsolete vehicles were partly superseded in the 1960s and early 1970s by modern U.S. Willys M38 MC ¼-ton (4x4) jeeps, Willys M38A1 MD ¼-ton (4x4) jeeps, M151 ¼-ton (4x4) utility trucks, Jeepster Commando (4x4) hardtop Sport utility vehicles (SUV), Dodge M37 ¾-ton (4x4) 1953 utility trucks, M35A1 2½-ton (6x6) cargo trucks and M809 5-ton (6x6) cargo trucks.

RLA uniforms and insignia
The Royal Lao Army owed its origin and traditions to the Laotian colonial ANL and CEFEO troops on French service of the First Indochina War, and even after the United States took the role as the main foreign sponsor for the Royal Laotian Armed Forces at the beginning of the 1960s, French military influence was still perceptible in their uniforms and insignia.

Service dress uniforms

Upon its formation at the early 1950s, ANL units were initially outfitted as were French CEFEO troops of the period – the basic Laotian Army working dress for all-ranks was the French Army's M1945 tropical light khaki cotton shirt and pants.  Modelled after the World War II US Army tropical "Chino" working dress, it consisted of a shirt with a six-buttoned front, two patch breast pockets closed by clip-cornered straight flaps and shoulder straps; the short-sleeved M1946 shirt, which had two pleated breast pockets closed by pointed flaps, or the "Chino"-style M1949 could be worn as an alternative in hot weather. Both shirt models' were worn with the matching M1945 pants, which featured two pleats at the front hips; the M1946 khaki shorts do not appear to have been much favoured by the Laotians. The "Chino" working uniform was initially furnished by France and later by the US aid programs(together with locally produced copies), continued to be worn by RLA officers and enlisted men as a service dress or for walking-out with a khaki tie.

A French-style, colonial-era white summer cotton dress uniform was initially worn by ANL officers for formal occasions, replaced in 1954 by an almost identical light khaki cotton version first adopted by senior officers serving in the ANL General Staff, and continued to be worn by their FAR successors until 1975.  The new khaki dress consisted of an eight-buttoned tunic with a standing collar, provided with two breast pockets and two side pockets, all unpleated and closed by clip-cornered straight flaps, worn with matching khaki slacks.  The tunic's front fly and pocket flaps were secured by gilt metal buttons bearing the FAR wreathed "Vishnu" trident.

RLA Officers continued to wear the standard ANL summer service dress uniform in khaki cotton, which was patterned after the French Army M1946/56 khaki dress uniform. The open-collar jacket had two pleated breast pockets closed by pointed flaps and two unpleated at the side closed by straight ones whilst the sleeves had false turnbacks; the front fly and pocket flaps were secured by gilt buttons.  It was worn with a Khaki shirt and black tie on service dress.

The Laotian Royal Guard were given a ceremonial dress uniform of French pattern, comprising a red kepi, white eight-buttoned cotton tunic with a standing collar and red fringed epaulettes, plus red cotton trousers with a line of gold braid down the outer side-seams.

Fatigue and field uniforms

The standard ANL field dress during the Indochina War was the French all-arms M1947 drab green fatigues, whilst airborne battalions received in the late 1940s surplus World War II-vintage US Marines Pattern 44 'Frog Skin' reversible camouflage utilities and British M1942 windproof pattern brushstroke camouflage Denison Smocks. Such early camouflage fatigues were gradually phased out from the early 1950s in favour of French-designed Lizard camouflage M1947/51, M1947/52 and M1947/53-54 TAP jump-smocks and M1947/52 TTA vests with matching trousers.

By the mid-1960s, RLA units in the field were using a wide variety of uniforms depending on availability from foreign aid sources, namely the U.S., Thailand, and South Vietnam.  The old French M1947 fatigues soon gave way to the US Army OG-107 jungle utilities, which was adopted as standard field dress by all the Laotian military regular and paramilitary irregular forces; M1967 Jungle Utility Uniforms also came into use by 1970.  Local variants of the OG-107 fatigues often featured modifications to the original design – shirts with shoulder straps, two "cigarrete pockets" closed by buttoned straight flaps on both upper sleeves, or a pen pocket added on the left sleeve above the elbow, an affection common to all Laotian, South Vietnamese and Cambodian military officers, and additional side "cargo" pockets on the trousers. Olive green US M-1951 field jackets were sometimes worn by RLA and irregular SGU personnel.

Camouflage was very popular among the Laotian military. Airborne formations continued to wear Lizard camouflage fatigues up until 1975, and new camouflage patterns were adopted by the RLA and the irregular SGUs throughout the 1960s-1970s. First was the Duck hunter pattern, followed by the similar South Vietnamese "Leopard" pattern (Vietnamese: Beo Gam) and Tigerstripe patterns from the United States, Thailand (Thai Tadpole and the so-called 'Rubber' Tigerstripe variant) and South Vietnam (Tadpole Sparse) and finally, by Highland patterns (ERDL 1948 Leaf pattern or "Woodland pattern"), the latter being either supplied by the same sources or locally produced.

Headgear

ANL officers received a service peaked cap copied after the French M1927 pattern with a lacquered black leather peak in both light khaki and white summer versions (the latter with gold embroidered flame decoration on the black cap band for general officers), to wear with the khaki service dress and the white high-collared full dress uniforms, respectively.  The peaked caps were worn with the standard gilt metal ANL cap device, a wreathed Airavata crest bearing the Laotian Royal Arms – a three-headed white elephant standing on a pedestal and surmounted by a pointed parasol – set on a black cloth teardrop-shaped background patch.
Upon the creation of the Royal Lao Armed Forces (FAR) in September 1961, the Royal Lao Army (RLA) adopted a new service peaked cap with crown of "Germanic" shape – very similar to that worn by South Vietnamese ARVN officers – with the standard gilt metal FAR wreathed trident cap device, again set on a black background though some field officers still wore the old ANL badge on their caps up until the mid-1960s. Like its predecessor, the new RLA service peaked cap also came in both khaki and white versions, with a gold cord chinstrap and plain black leather peak for intermediate rank officers whereas general officers' caps had gold embroidered flame decoration on both the black cap band and black leather peak and a gold braid chinstrap. French M1946 and M1957 light khaki sidecaps ( and ) were also worn by all-ranks. The Laotian Royal Guards received a French-style red kepi with a straight lacquered black leather peak and gold braid chinstrap to wear with their ceremonial full dress uniform.

The most common headgear for the ANL personnel during the 1950s was the French M1946 "Gourka" tropical beret, made of light khaki cotton cloth, but later the RLA standardized on a beret pattern whose design was based on the French M1953/59 model; it was made of wool in either one or two pieces, attached to a black leather rim with two black tightening straps at the back.
In the FAR, berets were still being worn pulled to the left in typical French fashion, with the color sequence for the ground forces as follows: General Service – scarlet red (the Kingdom of Laos' national color); Paratroopers, Para-Commandos and Special Forces – maroon; Armoured Cavalry – black; Military Police – dark blue. Berets made of camouflage cloth in the "Duck hunter", "Leopard", "Tigerstripe" and "Highland" patterns were also used in the field, particularly by elite units within the RLA and by the irregular SGU formations.
According to the 1959 regulations, General Service and corps' berets were worn with the standard RLA beret badge placed above the right eye. Issued in gilt metal for officers and in silver metal for the rank-and-file, it consisted of a trident, symbolizing the Hindu God Vishnu, superimposed on a spinning Buddhist "Wheel of Law" (Chakra) whose design recalled a circular saw.
There were however exceptions to this rule, such as the Laotian airborne battalions who retained the silver winged dagger metal airborne beret badge modelled after the French pattern previously adopted in the early 1950s, simply replacing the dagger by a Laotian trident after 1961.

Laotian troops in the field could be encountered wearing a wide range of Khaki or OG jungle hats and patrol caps, ranging from French M1949 bush hats and US M-1943 "Walker caps" and M-1951 field caps, to baseball caps, US "Boonie hats", and even South Vietnamese ARVN fatigue caps (similar in shape to the US Marines utility cap). Camouflage versions of these headpieces also found their way into the RLA and the SGUs from the United States, Thailand and South Vietnam, to which were soon added Laotian-made copies.

Steel helmets, in the form of the US M-1 and French M1951 NATO models were standard issue in the ANL, with paratroopers receiving either the US M-1C jump helmet and its respective French-modified versions ( and ) or the airborne pattern of the French M1951 helmet. Later, the RLA standardized on the modernized US M-1 model 1964 helmet, though the older American and French M1951 helmet patterns could still be encountered in the field among certain regular and irregular Laotian troops in 1971.  ANL armoured crews initially received the French M1951 and M1958/65 dark olive green leather crash helmets (Sous-casque radio-char modéle 1958 and Sous-casque radio-char modéle 1965); after 1971, Laotian M-706 and M113 APC crewmen were issued the fibreglass US Combat Vehicle Crew (CVC) T-56-6 helmet (dubbed the "bone dome"), though neither models offered any satisfactory protection against shrapnel or small arms rounds.

Footwear
White low laced leather shoes were prescribed to wear the earlier ANL white cotton full dress, whilst brown ones were worn with the khaki service/work uniform for all-ranks and, after 1954 the latter were required for RLA officers wearing the new FAR officers’ khaki dress uniform on formal occasions.
ANL personnel on the field initially wore a mixture of American and French regulation footwear, including brown leather US M-1943 Combat Service Boots, French M1917 brown leather hobnailed ankle boots, French M1953 brown leather "Rangers" and French canvas-and-rubber Pataugas tropical boots; paratroopers received the calf-length French M1950 or M1950/53 TAP black leather jump-boot models.
Black leather combat boots were also provided by the Americans who issued both the early US Army M-1962 "McNamara" model and the M-1967 model with "ripple" pattern rubbler sole; the highly prized US Army Jungle boot was not issued to the RLA but saw limited use after 1971 amongst members of elite units (e.g. Paratroopers, Special Forces) or by irregular guerrilla troops fighting in the jungle environment of southern Laos. Local copies of the South Vietnamese Bata tropical boots were also worn in the south.

Army ranks
Initially, ANL troops wore the same rank insignia as their French counterparts, whose sequence followed the French Army pattern defined by the 1956 regulations until 1959, when the Royal Lao Army adopted a new distinctively Laotian-designed system of military ranks, which became in September 1961 the standard rank chart for all branches of service of the newly created Royal Lao Armed Forces.

Under the new regulations, officers were entitled to wear on their service or dress uniforms stiffened red shoulder boards edged with gold braid and a gold wreathed trident at the inner end. Junior officers added an appropriate number of five-pointed gold stars to their boards whilst field grade officers had a single lotus leaf rosette, plus an appropriate number of five-pointed gold stars. Field Marshals and General officers had a gold leaf design around the lower half of their shoulder boards plus two or more five-pointed silver stars.  Senior and junior NCOs – including Private 1st class – wore cloth chevrons on both upper sleeves; enlisted men wore no insignia.

In the field, officers' shoulder boards were initially replaced by metal rank insignia pinned to simple rectangular red cloth tabs sewn over the right shirt or combat jacket pocket, but some senior officers kept the custom of wearing instead a single chest tab buttoned or pinned to the shirt's front fly following French Army practice.  By the late 1960s, an American-style system was adopted in which metal pin-on or embroidered cloth rank insignia – either in yellow-on-green full-colour or black-on-green subdued form – were worn on the right collar, though photographic evidence shows that officers on the field also had the habit of displaying their rank insignia on berets, baseball caps, bush hats and (more rarely) on steel helmets.

Rank insignia

Branch insignia
RLA skill and trade badges also came in gilt metal and/or enamelled pin-on and cloth embroidered yellow or black-on-green subdued variants. On dress and service uniforms, they were worn on both collars by all-ranks if shoulder boards were worn, but in the field officers wore them on the left shirt collar only if worn alongside collar rank insignia; enlisted ranks usually wore branch insignia on both collars instead.

Unit insignia
Yellow and subdued nametapes were occasionally worn above the right shirt or jacket pocket on field dress; plastic nameplates were worn with the service and dress uniforms.  Elite formations such as the Special Commando Company of the 2nd RLA Strike Division had their unit designation printed over their left pocket.

See also

 1967 Opium War
 Army of the Republic of Vietnam (ARVN)
 Air America
 Battle of Lang Vei
 Directorate of National Coordination
 Hmong people
 North Vietnamese invasion of Laos
 Pathet Lao
 Khmer National Armed Forces
 Lao Veterans of America
 Lao Veterans of America Institute
 Laos Memorial
 Laotian Civil War
 Royal Lao Air Force
 Royal Lao Army Airborne
 Royal Lao Police
 Vietnam War
 Weapons of the Laotian Civil War

Notes

References

Andrea Matles Savada (ed.), Laos: a country study (3rd ed.), Federal Research Division, Library of Congress, Washington, D.C. 1995. , OCLC 32394600. – 
 Albert Grandolini, Armor of the Vietnam War (2): Asian Forces, Concord Publications, Hong Kong 1998. 
 Bernard Fall, Anatomy of a Crisis: The Laotian Crisis of 1960–1961, Doubleday & Co., 1969. 
 Brig. Gen. Soutchay Vongsavanh, RLG Military Operations and Activities in the Laotian Panhandle, United States Army Center of Military History, Washington D.C. 1980.
John Walter, Walther Pistols – PP, PPK and P 38, Weapon series 82, Osprey Publishing Ltd, Oxford 2022. 
 Joseph D. Celeski, Special Air Warfare and the Secret War in Laos: Air Commandos 1964–1975, Air University Press, Maxwell AFB, Alabama 2019. –   
 Kenneth Conboy and Don Greer, War in Laos 1954-1975, Carrollton, TX: Squadron/Signal Publications, 1994. 
 Kenneth Conboy and Simon McCouaig, The War in Laos 1960-75, Men-at-arms series 217, Osprey Publishing Ltd, London 1989. 
 Kenneth Conboy and Simon McCouaig, South-East Asian Special Forces, Elite series 33, Osprey Publishing Ltd, London 1991. 
 Kenneth Conboy with James Morrison, Shadow War: The CIA's Secret War in Laos, Boulder CO: Paladin Press, 1995. , 1581605358
 Khambang Sibounheuang (edited by Edward Y. Hall), White Dragon Two: A Royal Laotian Commando's Escape from Laos, Spartanburg, SC: Honoribus Press, 2002. 
 Leroy Thompson, The M1 Carbine, Weapon series 13, Osprey Publishing Ltd, Oxford 2011. 
 Maj. Gen. Oudone Sananikone, The Royal Lao Army and U.S. Army advice and support, Indochina monographs series, United States Army Center of Military History, Washington D.C. 1981. – 
 Nina S. Adams and Alfred W. McCoy (eds.), Laos: War and Revolution, Harper & Row, New York 1970. 
 Roger Warner, Shooting at the Moon: The Story of America's Clandestine War in Laos, South Royalton, VT: Steerforth Press, 1998. 
Richard Lathrop, John McDonald and Jim Laurier, Cadillac Cage V-100 Commando 1960-71, New Vanguard series 52, Osprey Publishing Ltd, Oxford 2002. 
 Thomas Ahern, Undercover Armies: CIA and Surrogate Warfare in Laos, Center for the Study of Intelligence, Washington D.C. 2006. Classified control no. C05303949.
 Timothy Castle, At War in the Shadow of Vietnam: United States Military Aid to the Royal Lao Government, 1955–1975, Columbia University Press, 1993. 
 Victor B. Anthony and Richard R. Sexton, The War in Northern Laos, Command for Air Force History, 1993. 
 Steven J. Zaloga and Jim Laurier, M24 Chaffee Light Tank 1943–85, New Vanguard series 77, Osprey Publishing Ltd, Oxford 2003.

Secondary sources

 Arnold Issacs, Gordon Hardy, MacAlister Brown, et al., Pawns of War: Cambodia and Laos, Boston Publishing Company, Boston 1987. , 0-201-11678-2 
 Christophe Dutrône and Michel Roques, L'Escadron Parachutiste de la Garde Sud-Vietnam, 1947-1951, in Armes Militaria Magazine n.º 188, March 2001.  (in French)
 Christopher Robbins, Air America, Weidenfeld & Nicolson, 2012. 
 Christopher F. Foss, Jane's Tank & Combat Vehicle recognition guide, HarperCollins Publishers, London 2002. 
 Denis Lassus, Les marques de grade de l'armée française, 1945-1990 (1er partie-introduction), in Armes Militaria Magazine n.º 159, October 1998.  (in French)
 Denis Lassus, Les marques de grade de l'armée française, 1945-1990 (2e partie-les differents types de galons), in Armes Militaria Magazine n.º 161, December 1998.  (in French)
 Kenneth Conboy, Kenneth Bowra, and Simon McCouaig, The NVA and Viet Cong, Elite series 38, Osprey Publishing Ltd, Oxford 1992. 
 Kenneth Conboy, FANK: A History of the Cambodian Armed Forces, 1970-1975, Equinox Publishing (Asia) Pte Ltd, Djakarta 2011. 
 Military History Institute of Vietnam, Victory in Vietnam: The Official History of the People's Army of Vietnam, 1954–1975 (translated by Merle Pribbenow), Lawrence KS: University of Kansas Press, 2002. , 0-7006-1175-4 
 Paul Gaujac, Officiers et soldats de l'armée française d'après le TTA 148 (1943-1956), Histoire & Collections, Paris 2011.  (in French)

External links
Country Study - Kingdom of Laos
Country data Laos – The Royal Lao Army
Laotian National Army unit and branch insignia
Royal Lao Armed Forces and Police heraldry
Royal Lao Army and Special Guerrilla Units camouflage patterns
Royal Lao Army rank insignia
Royal Lao Army unit and branch insignia

Military of Laos
Royal Lao Armed Forces
Laos
Military units and formations disestablished in 1975
1949 establishments in Laos
1975 disestablishments in Laos
Laotian Civil War